Andrew Lewis Middle School is a former high school in Salem, Virginia, United States which was named after Andrew Lewis, an American pioneer, surveyor, and soldier from Virginia. He served as a colonel of militia during the French and Indian War, and as a brigadier general in the American Revolutionary War.

Namesake
In 1977, Andrew Lewis High School in Salem and Glenvar High School in western Roanoke County were consolidated into Salem High School.  

The building is now used by Andrew Lewis Middle School.

References

External links 
 Andrew Lewis Middle School

Schools in Salem, Virginia
Defunct schools in Virginia